William Osborn Stoddard (1835–1925) was an American journalist, inventor, and author of memoirs, novels, poetry, and children's books. He was known for serving in the White House as a private secretary to Abraham Lincoln.

Biography
Stoddard was born at Homer, New York, on September 24, 1835. His parents were Prentice S. and Sarah (Osborn) Stoddard. Stoddard's father was a bookseller, and Stoddard worked in his bookshop while growing up.

Stoddard attended the University of Rochester, where he entered with the Class of 1858 and graduated in 1857. After graduation, he was employed in an "editorial position" in 1857 at the Daily Ledger (Chicago); by 1858 he had become editor and proprietor of the Central Illinois Gazette, in Champaign, Illinois.

Stoddard knew Lincoln, worked hard for his election, and received a government appointment. He first served as a clerk in the Interior Department. On July 15, 1861, he was appointed "Secretary to the President to sign land patents." After a brief period of service in the Army, Stoddard became Assistant Private Secretary to Lincoln and "one of three people doing all the White House clerical work during the early Lincoln administration." Preparation of a digest of newspaper articles was one of his original responsibilities; it was stopped because, according to Stoddard, "Mr. Lincoln never found time to spend an hour upon laborious condensations." It is believed that Stoddard personally made the first copy of the draft Emancipation Proclamation in September 1862.

After two bouts with typhoid, Stoddard left his White House post in July 1864. On September 24, 1864, he was appointed United States Marshal for Arkansas; however, in 1865 he resigned for health reasons. He moved to New York City and worked briefly on Wall Street. He entered government service again from 1871 to 1873, this time for the government of New York City. He was a clerk for the Department of Docks.

Stoddard began publishing his writing in 1869. He wrote poetry, fiction, memoirs, biographies, and 76 children's books, ultimately producing over one hundred books in total.

Stoddard also received nine patents for inventions. One of his inventions was a center-locking printer's chase.

On July 25, 1870, Stoddard married Susan Eagleson Cooper; they had five children. He died at his home in Madison, New Jersey, on August 29, 1925.

Works

Dismissed (1878)
The Heart of It (1880)
Dab Kinzer (1881)
Esau Hardery (1882)
Saltillo Boys (1882)
Talking Leaves (1882)
Among the Lakes (1883)
Wrecked? (1883)
Life of Abraham Lincoln (1884)
Two arrows - a story of red and white (1886)
The Lives of the Presidents (10 vols. 1886-9)
The Red Beauty (1889)
Crowded Out o' Crofield (1890)
Inside the White House in War Times (1890)
The Red Mustang (1890)
Little Smoke - a tale of the Sioux (1891)
The White Cave (1893)
The Table Talk of Lincoln (1894)
On the Old Frontier (1895)
Winter Fun (1895)
The Windfall (1896)
The Lost Gold of the Montezumas (1897)
With the Black Prince (1898)
The Despatch Boat of the Whistle A Story of Santiago (1899)
Ulric the Jarl (1899)
Ned, the Son of Webb (1900)
The Noank's Log (1900)
Ahead of the Army (1903)
The Village Champion (1903)

References

External links
 
 
 
 Stoddard's connection to Francis Bicknell Carpenter
 
Guide to the William Osborn Stoddard Collection 1897-1902 at the University of Chicago Special Collections Research Center

1835 births
1925 deaths
University of Rochester alumni
19th-century American inventors
American children's writers
American male poets
American biographers
American newspaper reporters and correspondents
Lincoln administration personnel
United States Marshals
American male biographers